The Great and the Good is a 1996 novel by the French writer Michel Déon. It tells the story of a Frenchman who is born to a poor widow, moves to the United States in the 1950s and becomes a wealthy stockbroker, before he returns to France.

The book received the Grand prix Jean Giono.

Publication
The novel was published by éditions Gallimard on 5 September 1996. Upon the publication it was given a segment on France 3's literature program Un livre, un jour. An English translation by Julian Evans is set to be published on 10 January 2017 through Gallic Books.

References

External links
 Publicity page at the French publisher's website 
 Publicity page at the British publisher's website

1996 French novels
French-language novels
Novels by Michel Déon
Éditions Gallimard books